Emma Thomas Nolan (born 9 December 1971) is an English film producer, known for frequent collaborations with her husband, filmmaker Christopher Nolan. Her producing credits include The Dark Knight Trilogy (2005–2012), The Prestige (2006), Inception (2010), Interstellar (2014), Dunkirk (2017) and Tenet (2020). Inception and Dunkirk were nominated for the Academy Award for Best Picture.

Early life
Thomas was born in 1971 in London. She graduated from University College London, where she met Christopher Nolan, her future husband.

Career
Apart from producing films, Thomas worked as a script supervisor throughout the 1990s, and was an assistant to the director Stephen Frears on High Fidelity (2000). She has produced all of Nolan's films since 1997, with the exception of the short documentary film Quay (2015). Together they run the production company Syncopy Inc. She is a member of the board of trustees of the Academy Museum of Motion Pictures and is on the Motion Picture & Television Fund (MPTF) Board of Governors.

Personal life
Thomas married Christopher Nolan in 1997. , they live with their four children in Los Angeles.

Filmography

Accolades

Academy Awards

British Academy Film Awards

Golden Globe Awards

Producers Guild of America

References

External links 

 
 

1971 births
Living people
Alumni of University College London
English expatriates in the United States
English film producers
Film producers from California
Film producers from London
British film production company founders